= Autotrader EchoPark Automotive 400 =

Autotrader EchoPark Automotive 400 may refer to:

- NASCAR Cup Series at Atlanta Motor Speedway Spring Race, the future title sponsor of the race starting in 2026.
- NASCAR Cup Series at Dover Motor Speedway, the title sponsor of the race from 2025.
- NASCAR Cup Series at Texas Motor Speedway, the title sponsor of the race from 2023 to 2024.
